Zou Yigui (1686–1772), style name as Yuanbao (原褒), sobriquet as Xiaoshan (小山) and Erzhi (二知), is a famed Chinese painter in Qing Dynasty. He was born in Wuxi, Jiangsu Province.

He painted for the imperial family, skilled in painting flowers and landscapes. He once wrote a book named "Art of Painting of Xiaoshan" (小山畫譜), discussing the experience of painting.

Notes

References
Ci hai bian ji wei yuan hui (辞海编辑委员会）. Ci hai （辞海）. Shanghai: Shanghai ci shu chu ban she （上海辞书出版社）, 1979.

1686 births
1772 deaths
Qing dynasty landscape painters
Painters from Wuxi